Attila Andruskó (born 12 October 1980) is a Serbian-born Hungarian former professional footballer who played as a midfielder.

Career
After starting out at his hometown club Senta, Andruskó played regularly for Solunac Karađorđevo in the 2001–02 Second League of FR Yugoslavia. He subsequently moved to Hungary and joined Kaposvár. Between 2004 and 2006, Andruskó made 64 appearances and scored once in the top flight of Hungarian football.

In the summer of 2007, Andruskó switched to Slovenian club Primorje. He later moved back to Hungary and signed with Kaposvölgye in the summer of 2008.

In the summer of 2012, Andruskó returned to Serbia and joined his parent club Senta.

References

External links

 
 

Association football midfielders
BFC Siófok players
Expatriate footballers in Slovenia
FK Senta players
Hungarian expatriate footballers
Hungarian expatriate sportspeople in Slovenia
Hungarian footballers
Kaposvári Rákóczi FC players
Kaposvölgye VSC footballers
Kozármisleny SE footballers
Nemzeti Bajnokság I players
Nemzeti Bajnokság II players
NK Primorje players
People from Senta
Serbia and Montenegro footballers
Serbian footballers
Serbian people of Hungarian descent
Slovenian PrvaLiga players
1980 births
Living people